
Gmina Sienno is a rural gmina (administrative district) in Lipsko County, Masovian Voivodeship, in east-central Poland.

Villages
Gmina Sienno contains the villages and settlements of Adamów, Aleksandrów, Aleksandrów Duży, Bronisławów, Dąbrówka, Dębowe Pole, Eugeniów, Gozdawa, Hieronimów, Janów, Jaworska Wola, Kadłubek, Karolów, Kochanówka, Krzyżanówka, Leśniczówka, Ludwików, Nowa Wieś, Nowy Olechów, Osówka, Piasków, Praga Dolna, Praga Górna, Sienno, Stara Wieś, Stary Olechów, Tarnówek, Trzemcha Dolna, Trzemcha Górna, Wierzchowiska Drugie, Wierzchowiska Pierwsze, Wodąca, Wyględów, Wygoda and Zapusta.

Neighbouring gminas
Gmina Sienno is bordered by the gminas of Bałtów, Bodzechów, Brody, Ciepielów, Kunów, Lipsko, Rzeczniów and Tarłów.

References
Polish official population figures 2006

Sienno
Lipsko County